Amelia is an unincorporated community in southwestern Holt County, Nebraska, United States.  It lies along local roads near Nebraska Highways 11 and 95, southwest of the city of O'Neill, the county seat of Holt County. The community is named for Amelia A. Bliss.  Although Amelia is unincorporated, it has a post office, with the ZIP code of 68711.

Notable people
Jon Doolittle, singer/songwriter

References

Unincorporated communities in Holt County, Nebraska
Unincorporated communities in Nebraska